Donald's Golf Game is a cartoon released by the Walt Disney Company in 1938. Donald falters on the fairway while his caddies Huey, Dewey, and Louie all try to "tee" him off, with a grasshopper and a bag of trick clubs.

Plot
Donald Duck is taking his nephews Huey, Dewey, and Louie to a golf course to play golf. After his nephews build a stand made of sand, Donald prepares to swing but is interrupted by a tweeting songbird. Donald tells the bird to be quiet and it does. Before Donald can swing, he is interrupted again, this time by his nephews blowing into tissues. Angrily, Donald hushes them and sticks clips on their bills, only to have them thrown off and hit Donald (one in the tail). In a rage, Donald breaks his club and is offered a trick club by his nephews. Donald hits the golf ball only to find out that the "club" is actually a net and the ball is in the net right behind him. Donald gets another trick club which becomes an umbrella, creates a fake rainstorm, and pops out a fake bee.

Unable to stand the tricks any longer, Donald orders his nephews off the field. They soon find a grasshopper, however, and put it in a ball to make another trick for Donald. When Donald hits the ball, it bounces away all by itself instead of rolling. Donald chases after it and drives it into the golf pond. Huey, Dewey, and Louie offer him a raft to follow it but before Donald can catch the ball, they pull a valve making the raft deflate. Donald falls into the pond headfirst and tries to hit the ball from underwater. He hits it out of the water and follows it, only to discover that there's a grasshopper in it. The grasshopper bounces away and Donald follows, only to be trapped when his deflated raft (which he is still wearing around his waist) ties up around him after he trips. His nephews then begin playing their own game, hitting their balls between poles (and using Donald's head as a bounce-off stand) to get them into the holes. In a rage after they walk over him, Donald breaks free of the raft and throws his club at them, intending to hit them on the heads, but it bounces back and hits him instead, throwing him into the hole and leaving him shouting in rage (from inside the hole).

Voice cast
 Clarence Nash as Donald Duck, Huey, Dewie and Louie

Releases
 This short was one of the many featured in Donald Duck's 50th Birthday, however the clip is shown in French to show Donald's international appeal.
 1938 – theatrical release
 c. 1992 – Mickey's Mouse Tracks, episode #26 (TV)
 1997 – The Ink and Paint Club, episode #1.20: "Huey, Dewey and Louie" (TV)

Home media
The short was released on May 18, 2004 on Walt Disney Treasures: The Chronological Donald, Volume One: 1934-1941.

Additional releases include:
 1981 – "Mickey Mouse and Donald Duck Cartoon Collections Volume One" (VHS)
 1992 – "Cartoon Classics Special Edition: The Goofy World of Sports" (VHS)
 2006 – "Funny Factory with Donald" (DVD)
 2019 – "Disney+" (Streaming)

References

External links
 
 
 

1930s color films
1938 films
1930s Disney animated short films
1930s sports films
Donald Duck short films
1938 animated films
Golf animation
Films directed by Jack King
Films produced by Walt Disney
Films scored by Oliver Wallace
Films with screenplays by Carl Barks
1930s American films